Jeffrey Allen Jones (born July 29, 1956) is an American former professional baseball pitcher and coach. He played for the Oakland Athletics of Major League Baseball (MLB) from 1980 until 1984. He served as pitching coach for the Detroit Tigers of the MLB from 2011 to 2015.

Personal
Born in Detroit, Michigan, Jeff graduated from nearby Southgate High School, (now Southgate Anderson High School) in Southgate, Michigan.

He has two grown daughters, Audrey and Whitney, and lives in Carleton, Michigan with his wife.

Playing career
Jones pitched for five seasons in Oakland (1980–84), almost entirely out of the bullpen (three starts in 112 appearances).  He compiled a 9–9 record and eight saves with a 3.95 ERA, striking out 128 batters in 205 innings.

Coaching career
Jones was the pitching coach for the Double-A London Tigers in 1989, 1991 and 1992. He then went to the Triple-A Toledo Mud Hens in 1990 and 1994 to be their pitching coach.

After numerous stints as the Tigers bullpen coach, most recently 2007–2011, Jones was moved to the position of pitching coach on July 3, 2011.  This followed the firing of pitching coach Rick Knapp, after a six-game stretch where Tiger pitchers gave up a combined 54 runs against the New York Mets and San Francisco Giants. Jones' contract expired at the end of the 2011 season, but the Tigers chose to tender a new contract to bring him back for 2012 and beyond.

On October 19, 2015, Jones announced his retirement, following 38 years in baseball. During his tenure as pitching coach, Jones coached two Tigers pitchers to Cy Young Awards, Justin Verlander in 2011, and Max Scherzer in 2013.

References

External links

1956 births
Living people
Baseball coaches from Michigan
Baseball players from Detroit
Chattanooga Lookouts players
Daytona Beach Explorers players
Detroit Tigers coaches
Glens Falls Tigers players
Jersey City A's players
Major League Baseball bullpen coaches
Major League Baseball pitchers
Minor league baseball coaches
Modesto A's players
Oakland Athletics players
Ogden A's players
People from Monroe County, Michigan
Tacoma Tigers players
Tigres de Aragua players
American expatriate baseball players in Venezuela
Toledo Mud Hens players
United States national baseball team people